The Tour de Berlin was a road bicycle race held annually between 1953 and 2016 in Germany. From 2007 to its demise, the race was organised as a 2.2U event on the UCI Europe Tour, meaning it was reserved for under-23 riders.

Winners

References

UCI Europe Tour races
Cycle races in Germany
1953 establishments in Germany
Recurring sporting events established in 1953
2016 disestablishments in Germany
Recurring sporting events disestablished in 2016